Runnymede Sculpture Farm is a private sculpture park in Woodside, California. It displays approximately 140 pieces of contemporary sculpture on 120 acres.  The land was purchased in 1930 by Alma Spreckels Rosekrans for her horses and named after her father's prized stallion, Runnymede, sire of Kentucky Derby winner Morvich.

References

Sculpture gardens, trails and parks in California
Woodside, California
Tourist attractions in San Mateo County, California
Sculpture gardens, trails and parks in the United States